C.I.A., a name short for Cru' in Action!, replacing the earlier name Stereo Crew, was a rap trio, K-Dee, Sir Jinx, and Ice Cube, on the Los Angeles rap scene in the 1980s. The trio debuted at parties thrown by Sir Jinx's cousin Dr. Dre. Dre was in one of the Los Angeles area's leading DJ crews, the World Class Wreckin' Cru, whose core members, including Dre, doubled as a successful electro rap group. In 1986, the Stereo Crew's single "She's a Skag" arrived on Epic Records, which soon dropped the group for poor sales. 

The Stereo Crew then signed with Kru Cut Records—a sublabel run by Grandmaster Lonzo, who, leading the World Class Wreckin' Cru, had formed it for the WCWC's early releases—while the trio changed its name to C.I.A. The trio did backing vocals on the WCWC song "Cabbage Patch," while C.I.A.'s only release, "My Posse," produced by Dre in a classic, Roland TR-808 manner, arrived in 1987. Meanwhile, Eric Wright, soon dubbed Eazy-E, having a new label, Ruthless Records, formed with Cube and Dre the pioneering gangsta rap group N.W.A. K-Dee and Sir Jinx would later go on to form Da Lench Mob.

Discography

Singles 
"She's a Skag" (1986) (as Stereo Crew)
"My Posse" (1987)

References 

N.W.A
Hip hop groups from California
Ice Cube
Musical groups from Los Angeles
American musical trios
African-American musical groups